The Heart of England Forest is a charitable organisation in England, focussed on the conservation and restoration of native woodland in Warwickshire and Worcestershire.

The Forest is located in an area that was covered by the ancient Forest of Arden before deforestation. The charity has planted more than 2 million trees, in addition to conserving ancient woodland sites. Other habitat restoration projects within the Forest include wetlands and grasslands. The woodland areas are used by local schools to educate children about forests and wildlife.

Wildlife

Species recorded in the Forest include:

 Purple emperor
 Great crested newt
 Common buzzard
 Barn owl
 Eurasian woodcock
 Roe deer

See also
Community Forests in England
English Lowlands beech forests

References

External links
 The Heart Of England Forest

Forests and woodlands of Warwickshire
Tourist attractions in Warwickshire
Protected areas of Warwickshire
Charities based in England